Eurasia Group is a political risk consultancy founded in 1998 by Ian Bremmer.

History
Eurasia Group reports on emerging markets including frontier and developed economies, in addition to establishing practices focused on geo-technology and energy issues. The organization's 2011 "Top Risks report" description of a G-Zero world lacking global leadership received attention at the World Economic Forum’s Annual Meeting in Davos in 2011, as well as in international media. American politics led the firm’s 2020 report, which was updated and re-released in the wake of the coronavirus pandemic.

In 2017, Eurasia Group launched a media company called GZERO Media, featuring digital programming as well as a US national public television show called GZERO World with Ian Bremmer.

Partnerships

Eurasia Group announced a partnership with Nikko Asset Management in 2015 to incorporate political risk analysis into emerging market investment funds. According to The Wall Street Journal, "this is the first such partnership between the consultancy and an asset manager". In 2005, Eurasia Group purchased Intellibridge, a political risk consultancy founded by David Rothkopf in 1999.

Announcing a partnership with NYSE Euronext, Eurasia Group rang the opening bell at the New York Stock Exchange on March 18, 2009.

Similar companies
 Control Risks Group
 Oxford Analytica
 Roubini Global Economics
 Le Beck International
 Economist Intelligence Unit

References

External links 

 

International management consulting firms
Management consulting firms of the United States
Companies based in Manhattan
Consulting firms established in 1998
Privately held companies based in New York City
Political risk consulting firms